Konradowo  (German: Kursdorf) is a village in the administrative district of Gmina Wschowa, within Wschowa County, Lubusz Voivodeship, in western Poland.

References

Konradowo